Harold Winthrop Martin (September 23, 1887 – April 14, 1935) was an American Major League Baseball pitcher. He attended Tufts University and played for the Athletics while still a student at Tufts. In 1911, he joined the Athletics after finishing his college semester in June and then returned to college after the end of the World Series, which the Athletics won although Martin did not pitch in the series. The 1912 Reach Guide described him as a "clever young pitcher" and said that the Athletics were "fortunate" in his "gradual development" in their pursuit of the 1911 league championship. As of the beginning of the 1911he was expected to graduate as a doctor in June 1912. He only pitched in two games for the Athletics in 1912 and never played professionally again.

Martin played semi-pro baseball prior to 1911 for a team in Rockport, Massachusetts where he was a teammate of future Athletics teammate Stuffy McInnis.

References

External links

 

1887 births
1935 deaths
Major League Baseball pitchers
Philadelphia Athletics players
Tufts University alumni
People from Roxbury, Boston
Baseball players from Boston